Kenneth Duane Clark Jr. (born October 4, 1995) is an American football nose tackle for the Green Bay Packers of the National Football League (NFL). Playing college football for the UCLA Bruins, he was named a third-team All-American as a junior in 2015, when he also earned his second all-conference selection in the Pac-12. He was selected by the Packers in the first round of the 2016 NFL draft, with the 27th overall pick.

Early years
Clark attended Wilmer Amina Carter High School in Rialto, California. As a senior, he had 71 tackles and 11 sacks. He was rated by Rivals.com as a four-star recruit and committed to the University of California, Los Angeles (UCLA) to play college football. Clark also wrestled in high school.

College career

Clark appeared in all 13 games as a true freshman at UCLA in 2013. He started four games and had 31 tackles. As a sophomore in 2014, Clark was a second-team All-Pac-12 selection after starting all 13 games and making 58 tackles. Already established as a strong run defender, he improved as a pass rusher as a junior after entering 2015 with just one career sack. He had a career-high three sacks against Washington State. He was named third-team All-American by the Associated Press and was the lone Bruin named first-team All-Pac-12. Clark had a career-high 11 tackles in the Foster Farms Bowl against Nebraska, and ranked second on the team with 75 tackles and six sacks. After the season, he decided to forgo his senior year and enter the 2016 NFL draft.

Professional career

Clark was selected in the first round (27th overall) by the Green Bay Packers in the 2016 NFL Draft.

On July 17, 2016, the Green Bay Packers signed Clark to a four-year, $9.36 million contract with $7.18 million guaranteed and a signing bonus of $5.00 million.

He began his rookie season as a starting defensive tackle alongside veteran Mike Daniels. He was also named a backup and rotational defensive end in the Packers' 3–4 defense.

Clark made his professional debut in the Packers' season opener against the Jacksonville Jaguars and made one assisted tackle in the 23–27 victory. On September 25, 2016, he made his first career start against the Detroit Lions and racked up a total of four tackles in the Packer's win. In Week 14, Clark made four combined tackles during a 38–10 victory against the Seattle Seahawks. As a rookie in 2016, Clark finished with 21 tackles and two passes defended in 16 games.

In Week 13 of the 2017 season, Clark recorded 1.5 sacks, his first of his NFL career and 6 combined tackles in a 26–20 OT win over the Tampa Bay Buccaneers. He finished the season with 4.5 sacks and 55 tackles.

Clark had a breakout season in 2018, recording 55 tackles, three passes defensed, and six sacks, and was named a Pro Bowl alternate. He suffered an elbow injury in Week 14 and was placed on injured reserve on December 25, 2018.

On April 22, 2019, the Packers picked up the fifth-year option on Clark's contract.

On August 15, 2020, Clark signed a four-year, $70 million contract extension with a $25 million signing bonus.
In the Divisional Round of the playoffs against the Los Angeles Rams, Clark recorded 1.5 sacks on Jared Goff during the 32–18 win. On December 23, 2021, Clark was named to his second Pro Bowl.

On February 23, 2022, Clark agreed to a restructured deal that converted $13.6 million into a signing bonus to save $10.9 million of salary cap space.

NFL career statistics

Regular season

Postseason

References

External links

Green Bay Packers bio
UCLA Bruins bio

1995 births
Living people
Players of American football from California
Sportspeople from San Bernardino, California
American football defensive tackles
UCLA Bruins football players
Green Bay Packers players
National Conference Pro Bowl players